To a Woman of Honour is a 1924 German silent film directed by Rudolf Biebrach and starring Lucy Doraine, Georg H. Schnell and Fritz Greiner. 

The film's sets were designed by the art director Carl Ludwig Kirmse.

Cast

References

Bibliography

External links

1924 films
Films of the Weimar Republic
German silent feature films
Films directed by Rudolf Biebrach
German black-and-white films
1920s German films